Nashville Review is an online, MFA student-run literary magazine at Vanderbilt University.

A triannual review, Nashville Review publishes fiction, poetry, comics, art, nonfiction, and performance art videos.

Past contributors include Anuradha Bhowmik, Sydney Freeland, Celia Rowlson-Hall, Christopher Citro, Michael Meyerhofer, and Bryan Furuness.

References

Literary magazines published in the United States
Vanderbilt University media
Magazines published in Tennessee
Triannual magazines published in the United States